Baganov is a Russian masculine surname, its feminine counterpart is Baganova. Notable people with the surname include:

Tatiana Baganova, Russian contemporary dance choreographer
Vitali Baganov born 1952), Russian film and television actor

Russian-language surnames